Euphaedra sarita is a butterfly in the family Nymphalidae. It is found in Cameroon, the Republic of the Congo, the Central African Republic, the Democratic Republic of the Congo and Ethiopia.

Description
 
E. sarita E. Sharpe (44 c), like inanum, has no black markings on the under surface except 1-3 dots in the cells; the ground-colour of the underside is very variable, light green -yellow-green - yellow-brown, and the hindwing has no white median band but occasionally light green submarginal spots; the subapical band of the forewing is in the male above dark green and triangular, beneath quite obsolete or only indicated, in the female whitish; the blue-green hindmarginal spot on the forewing reaches at least to vein 2. Congo - ab. abyssinica Rothsch. has on the under surface the base of the costal margin of the hindwing bright ochre-yellow and a black spot on the precostal vein. Abyssinia.

Subspecies
Euphaedra sarita sarita (Cameroon, Congo, Central African Republic, central and northern Democratic Republic of the Congo, western Uganda: Semuliki National Park)
Euphaedra sarita abyssinica Rothschild, 1902 (south-western Ethiopia)
Euphaedra sarita lulua Hecq, 1977 (southern Democratic Republic of the Congo)

Similar species
Other members of the Euphaedra ceres species group

References

Butterflies described in 1891
sarita
Butterflies of Africa